Curiosity Shop is an American children's educational television program produced by ABC. The show was executive produced by veteran Looney Tunes director/animator Chuck Jones, sponsored by the Kellogg's cereal company and created as a commercial rival to the successful public television series Sesame Street. Curiosity Shop was broadcast from September 11, 1971 to September 2, 1973. The program featured three inquisitive children (two boys and a girl) who each week visited a shop populated with various puppets and gadgets, discovering interesting things about science, nature and history. Each hour-long show covered a specific theme: clothing, music, dance, weather, the five senses, space, time, rules, flight, dolls, etc.

Production
After NET (soon to become PBS) premiered Sesame Street in November 1969, the show proved to be successful and gained high ratings; its success gained attention from Michael Eisner, ABC’s Vice President. He asked animator Chuck Jones to create a series to rival its success and be the executive producer. Kellogg’s signed on to be the show’s sponsor. Unlike Sesame Street, the show is geared more towards young adolescents.

Jones and Eisner tapped puppeteer Bob Baker (cofounder of the Bob Baker Marionette Theater) to create the show’s puppets and its setting. Baker was reluctant at first, though he later agreed.

Noted screenwriter Irving Phillips provided some scripts and animation art, including an animation of his long-running syndicated comic strip The Strange World of Mr. Mum. Animations of Mell Lazarus's comic strip Miss Peach, Johnny Hart's comic strip The Wizard Of Id, Virgil Partch's cartoon Big George and Hank Ketcham's Dennis the Menace were also presented on the show. Abraham "Abe" Levitow animated most of these short segments. Ray Bradbury is also credited as one of the show's writers.

Academy Award-winning composer Henry Mancini created the bossa nova theme music for the show's title sequence (animated by Jones). Dean Elliott wrote additional music for the show.

At the end of the shows run, all of the tapes were destroyed, with only two episodes surviving in the hands of private collectors and performers.

Cast and Characters
John Levin and Kerry McLane played Gerard and Ralph, the two boys. Alternating in the girl's role were Pamelyn Ferdin as Pam and Jerelyn Fields as Cindy.

Barbara Minkus made a regular appearance as Gittle, a witch who magically appeared whenever someone said a phrase that included "which."

Chuck Jones contributed two new animated characters to the show: 
 Professor S. I. Trivia, a bespectacled "bookworm," who lived in a dictionary and was always on hand to supply a definition to a word the children didn't know.
 Monsieur Cou Cou was a French-accented bird who lived inside the shop's cuckoo clock and whose catchphrase was, "That's right!" He always tried to catch Prof. Trivia with a nosedive before the worm invariably dodged the bird just in time, repeatedly causing him to ram into the dictionary and get his beak stuck in it.

Mel Blanc, June Foray, Bob Holt, Don Messick and Les Tremayne provided the voices of the puppets.

Puppet characters

Created by Bob Baker (co-founder of the Bob Baker Marionette Theater in Los Angeles), the show's puppets included:
 Flip, (voiced by Messick) an orange hippopotamus with a jive-talking voice and oversized sneakers. Flip was the only character on the show to be portrayed as both a hand puppet and a full-body costume.
 Baron Balthazar, (voiced by Tremayne) a bearded, derby-hatted little man who would spin tales, in animated form, about his adventures and inventions back in his homeland, "Downtown Bosnia." The cartoons were originally a series called Professor Balthazar that was produced in Croatia when it was part of Yugoslavia (as Bosnia also was at the time).
 The Oogle, a marsupial-like silent creature with a beak-like mouth, a hayseed-style hat, and a demeanor of clownish confusion and disillusion.
 Onomatopoeia, a multi-legged furry beast that spoke in sound effects, partially inspired by an alien in a Professor Balthazar episode.
 Woodrow the groundhog, (voiced by Messick) who often yelled "Qui-e-e-e-e-e-t!" when things got out of hand and woke him from his slumber.
 Eek A. Mouse, who often emerged from the wall to scream for quiet as well.
 Nostalgia, (voiced by Foray) a chronically forgetful but sweet-tempered elephant who was intimidated by Eek.
 Hermione Giraffe, (voiced by Foray) a haughty giraffe wearing a gem-studded tiara.
 Aarthur the Aardvark, (voiced by Foray) a yellow aardvark who, contrary to the usual stereotype, hates ants.
 Ole Factory the Bloodhound, (voiced by Blanc) a wise bloodhound with hay fever.
 Halcyon the Hyena, (voiced by Blanc) a green hyena with world-weary eyes.
 Oliver Wendell Lookout, (voiced by Holt) an owl dressed in flight gear.
 Miss Fowler, a flower in a pot.

Other characters

 Two real animals made occasional appearances; Darwin, a chimpanzee who made his home in a treehouse on the show, and Eunice, a seal who lived in a waterbed — literally a water tank shaped like a bed.
 A talking computer with tape-reel eyes who satisfied the children's curiosity about any subject and presented educational movies, tapes, cartoons, vocabulary series, etc., on his screen-mouth.
 Hudson, a gravelly-voiced rock who told stories of prehistory. (Named as a pun after Rock Hudson, the actor.)
 Granny TV, a rocking antique television set who presented classic film comedies by Charlie Chaplin, Buster Keaton, Will Rogers, or the like.
 Havemeyer the Helping Hand, an animate white-gloved hand.
 Mr. Jones, the enigmatic owner of the store whose only means of communication between him and the visiting children was messages left on a tape recorder. Although named after series creator Chuck Jones, Messick provided the voice of the fictional Jones. Pamelyn Ferdin often concluded an episode by saying, "Goodbye, Mr. Jones — wherever you are."

Guests

Guests on the program included:
 Vincent Price in a special Halloween episode, where the Curiosity Shop took the form of a haunted house.
 Don Herbert as his popular TV scientist personality Mr. Wizard.
 Two appearances by Dennis the Menace cartoonist Hank Ketcham, who presented the first animated cartoons of Dennis, as well as comic strips in which Dennis interacted with the kids on the show.

Shirley Jones appeared on the show's pilot, "The Curiosity Shop Special," which featured all four children. It was on this pilot that the first song from Multiplication Rock, "Three Is a Magic Number," would make its debut. (The pilot aired in prime time, Thursday, September 2, 1971, pre-empting Alias Smith and Jones.)

Episodes

References

External links 
 Curiosity Shop at the Internet Movie Database
 Archive of American Television: Curiosity Shop
 "Curiosity Shop TV Show" on Facebook

American Broadcasting Company original programming
1970s American children's television series
1971 American television series debuts
1972 American television series endings
American children's education television series
American television series with live action and animation
American television shows featuring puppetry
Lost television shows